Seykavand-e Chavari (also Romanized as Seykavand-e Chavārī; also known as Seykavand, Seykvand, Sagvand, and Sīkvand) is a village in Nurali Rural District, in the Central District of Delfan County, Lorestan Province, Iran. At the 2006 census, its population was 301, in 63 families.

References 

Towns and villages in Delfan County